LSST may refer to:

 Large Synoptic Survey Telescope, former name of the Vera C. Rubin Observatory astronomical observatory in Chile
 Legacy Survey of Space and Time, an astronomical survey performed at the Vera C. Rubin Observatory
 Lowstand systems tract, a type of sedimentary deposit in sequence stratigraphy
 The Priory Academy LSST, formerly Lincoln School of Science and Technology, a school in Lincolnshire, England, UK
 Legal Services Support Team, units of the United States Marine Corps Judge Advocate Division

See also

 
 LST (disambiguation)
 list (disambiguation)